Van Tilburg is a Dutch toponymic surname meaning "from Tilburg". A number of variant spelling exist(ed), including Van Tilborch, Van Tilborg(h), Van Tilburch and Van Tilburgh. People with this name include:

Gillis van Tilborgh (c.1625–c.1678), Flemish genre painter 
Henk van Tilburg (1898–1985), Dutch football goalkeeper
Jacob Abraham van Tilburg (1888–1980), Dutch art collector who created the Van Tilburg Collection in Pretoria, South Africa
Jo Anne Van Tilburg (born 1940s), American archaeologist
Walter Van Tilburg Clark (1909–1971), American writer and educator

References

Dutch-language surnames
Toponymic surnames